Nottinghamshire Pride is a registered charity in Nottingham, Nottinghamshire, England. It organises an annual LGBT pride festival with the same name, held within the city of Nottingham. The event usually takes place during July. The charity has stated that "the purpose of Pride is to provide a safe focal point to bring together our community to celebrate our diversity and a sense of pride which for some people may be difficult in everyday life, due to prejudice and injustice."

The event usually consists of a day-long celebration, including a parade, stalls, art, music and other activities.

History

The first pride festival in Nottingham was held on Broad Street in 1997 under the name Pink Lace, a name it retained in 1998 and 1999, when Pink Lace was held at Nottingham Castle.

2000s
In the year 2000, the festival took the name Nottingham Pride and was held on the Victoria Embankment alongside the River Trent.

Two pride festivals, Nottingham Pride and Pink Lace, were planned in Nottingham in 2001, but neither were successful. No pride festival was laid on in Nottingham in 2002.

Nottingham Pride returned in 2003 at the Arboretum, where each subsequent Nottingham Pride festival took place until 2010, by which time the number of attendants had increased to a point where the park was no longer a suitable venue.

2010s

Nottingham Pride 2010 took place at the Forest Recreation Ground on 31 July. It was officially opened by the Lord Mayor of Nottingham, Brian Grocock, and the event was headlined by The Cheeky Girls, with other acts including Kenelis, Lisa Scott-Lee and Betty.

Pride 2011 had over 20,000 visitors, with headline act Ruth Lorenzo performing. That year, E.ON UK was the principal sponsor of Nottinghamshire Pride.

In 2018 Pride was held on Saturday 28 July in the city centre of Nottingham. The parade included many live events by various individuals, stalls, art and music, along with a pride parade that took place at 11 am. The parade began at Lister Gate and finished at Broad Street.

Pride 2018 was sponsored by various organisations, including Nottingham City Council, Nottinghamshire Fire and Rescue Service and Capital One.

In 2019 Nottinghamshire Pride was held on Saturday 27 July in Nottingham city centre.

References

External links

Culture in Nottingham
Pride parades in England
Recurring events established in 1997
1997 establishments in England
1997 in LGBT history